Eremospatha is a genus of climbing flowering plants in the palm family found in tropical Africa.  These rattans are uncommon in cultivation and poorly understood by taxonomists;.  Closely related to Laccosperma, they differentiated by the near complete absence of bracts and bracteoles. The name is from Greek meaning "without a spathe".

Description
The slender, high-climbing trunks are naturally clustering and can reach up to 45 m in length.  The pinnate leaves range from 30 cm to 2.5 m on short, armed petioles;  the rachis, leaf margins and cirri are also armed with spines.  They are hermaphroditic, with both male and female reproductive organs present in each flower.  The pale blooms are fragrant and produce a red to brown, scaly fruit, each containing one to three seeds.

Distribution and habitat
These palms are native to the rain forest of west Africa, the Congo Basin, and to Tanzania where they grow in swamps and alongside rivers.

Species
Accepted species:

 Eremospatha barendii Sunderl. - Cameroon
 Eremospatha cabrae (De Wild. & T.Durand) De Wild. - Zaire, Congo-Brazzaville, Cabinda, Gabon, Central African Republic 
 Eremospatha cuspidata (G.Mann & H.Wendl.) H.Wendl. -  Zaire, Congo-Brazzaville, Cabinda, Equatorial Guinea, Gabon, Central African Republic, Angola, Zambia
 Eremospatha dransfieldii Sunderl. - Sierra Leone, Ivory Coast, Ghana
 Eremospatha haullevilleana De Wild. - Cameroon, Zaire, Congo-Brazzaville, Cabinda, Gabon, Central African Republic, Burundi, Uganda, Tanzania
 Eremospatha hookeri (G.Mann & H.Wendl.) H.Wendl. - Nigeria, Cameroon, Congo-Brazzaville, Gabon, Central African Republic, Equatorial Guinea
 Eremospatha laurentii De Wild. - Liberia, Sierra Leone, Nigeria, Cameroon, Zaire, Congo-Brazzaville, Gabon, Central African Republic, Equatorial Guinea
 Eremospatha macrocarpa Schaedtler - Cameroon, Gabon, Central African Republic, Equatorial Guinea, Benin, Ghana, Guinea, Ivory Coast, Liberia, Nigeria, Sierra Leone 
 Eremospatha quinquecostulata Becc. - Nigeria, Cameroon
 Eremospatha tessmanniana Becc. - Cameroon, Equatorial Guinea
 Eremospatha wendlandiana Dammer ex Becc. - Nigeria, Cameroon, Congo-Brazzaville, Gabon, Central African Republic, Equatorial Guinea, Cabinda

References

External links
 Eremospatha on NPGS/GRIN
 GBIF Portal
 Fairchild Guide to Palms: Eremospatha

Calamoideae
Arecaceae genera
Flora of Africa